Mali Mariyappa (18 February 1912 - 1968) was an Indian politician, elected to the Lok Sabha, the lower house of the Parliament of India as a member of the Indian National Congress.

Early life and background 
Mali Mariyappa was born on 18 February 1912 in Sira town. Mali Dodda Madappa was his father. He completed his B.A. and LLB education from Maharaja's College, Mysore and Ferguson College, Poona.

Personal life 
Mali Mariyappa married Shrimati Lax-mamma on 2 June 1932 and the couple has 2 sons and 3 daughters.

Political career 
Mali Mariyappa was active Member of the Congress since 1936 and served as a President and Secretary of District Congress Committee of Tumkur. He was Chairman of Reception Committee of Mysore Congress Annual Session held at Tumkur. In 1962, He became the member of Pradesh Election Committee.

Position held 

 Member of State Congress Executive Committee.
 Member of M.P.C.C. (Since 1936)
 Chairman of Reception Committee of Mysore Congress Annual Session held at Tumkur.
 Member of Pradesh Election Committee (1962)
 President of Vallabhbhai Patel Memorial National Society Ltd.
 President of Mahatma Gandhi National Education Society Ltd. Madhugiri.
 Member of Executive Committee in District Central Co-operative Bank Ltd., Tumkur.
 Member of Managing Committee in Seva Mandir, Hindupur.
 Member of All India Khadi and Village Industries Board.
 Director of Bellary Spinning and Weaving Co. Ltd. Bellary.
 Member of Tata Institute of Science, Bangalore.

References

External links
Official biographical sketch in Parliament of India website

1912 births
1968 deaths
India MPs 1967–1970
Lok Sabha members from Karnataka
India MPs 1962–1967
Indian National Congress politicians from Karnataka